The Balgzand Gas Plant is a natural gas processing plant (gasbehandelingsinstallatie) in the Netherlands.

History
Discovery of offshore gas near the Netherlands began in 1968 in the Rotliegend sandstone near the Broad Fourteens. A large gas field was discovered to the north in 1987, and exploration of this led to the NOGAT Pipeline System which leads to the plant.

The plant began running in 1992.

Operation
The gas is taken into the plant on three pipelines, and processed, then put into the domestic natural gas Gasunie network.

NOGAT Pipeline System
The NOGAT Pipeline System (Northern Offshore Gastransport) connects the gas plant to gas fields to the north.

Balgzand Bacton Line
The BBL Pipeline connects the gas plant to the Bacton Gas Terminal in Norfolk in the United Kingdom. A gas pipeline from here to Germany connects with the Nord Stream 1 pipeline. It began production on 1 December 2006 and is 235 km long.

Structure
It is situated near the junction of the N99 and N9 motorways in North Holland, east of the De Kooy Airfield (Den Helder Airport).

Centrica gas fields

F3-FA
The field was discovered in 1971. The F3-FA gas field is operated by Centrica of the UK, who have owned it since August 2009. The water depth is around 40 metres. Gas is transferred via the 23 km NOGAT pipeline.

References

External links
 NOGAT history
 BBL Company

1992 establishments in the Netherlands
Buildings and structures in North Holland
Gas
Economy of North Holland
Energy infrastructure completed in 1992
Hollands Kroon
Natural gas infrastructure in the Netherlands
Natural gas plants
20th-century architecture in the Netherlands